The Puhua Temple is a Buddhist temple located in Taihuai Town of Wutai County, Xinzhou, Shanxi, China.

History
The time for the establishment of the Puhua Temple has been unable to be verified. It is also called "Temple of Jade Emperor" and "Palace of Indra". The present temple was completed in 1925 during the Republic of China (1912-1949).

Architecture
The Puhua Temple complex is located in the east and faces the west. With a brief layout, it includes the Hall of Four Heavenly Kings, Mahavira Hall, Hall of Jade Emperor, Hall of Lü Dongbin, and south and north annex halls.

Zhaobi
The Zhaobi is built by stones and bricks. The front of the Zhaobi are engraved with the Sanxing (deities) and the back of the wall are engraved with Guanyin, Sudhana and Longnü.

Hall of Four Heavenly Kings
Under the eaves of the Hall of Four Heavenly Kings is a plaque with the Chinese characters "". In front of the hall, a wooden plaque with a couplet is hung on the two side pillars. It says "". Maitreya is enshrined in the hall and at the back of his statue is a statue of Skanda. Unlike other temples, Statues of Nryana are also enshrined in the hall. The hall are carved with openwork patterns, which show proficient skills. The patterns are Monkey King, human figures of cowboy, shepherd, oldman etc. The shrine of Maitreya are engraved with splendid and spectacular wooden dragons. In the wall of the Hall of Four Heavenly Kings are engraved with the Picture-Book of Twenty-Four Acts of Filial Piety and the Four Natural Organs.

Mahavira Hall
The Mahavira Hall enshrining the Three Saints of Hua-yan. In the middle is Sakyamuni, statues of Manjushri and Samantabhadra stand on the left and right sides of Sakyamuni's statue. At the back of Sakyamuni's statue are statues of the Three Sages of the West, namely Guanyin, Amitabha and Mahasthamaprapta. The statues of Eighteen Arhats stand on both sides of the hall.

Three Buddhas Hall
Behind the Mahavira Hall is the Three Buddhas Hall enshrining the statues of Sakyamuni, Amitabha and Bhaisajyaguru. The two disciples' statues are placed in front of the statue of Sakyamuni, the older is called Kassapa Buddha and the middle-aged is called Ananda. Statues of Indra and Brahma are placed next to the statues of Sakyamuni, Amitabha and Bhaisajyaguru. The four pillars inside the hall are engraved with dedicate and gorgeousness karavika-bhani. The statues of Eighteen Arhats stand on the platform of gable wall.

Gallery

References

Buddhist temples in Xinzhou
Wutai County
Xinzhou